Karanga is a ward of Moshi Urban, in the Kilimanjaro Region region of Tanzania. Its name is derived from the Karanga River that passes through the ward.

In 2016 the Tanzania National Bureau of Statistics report there were 7,641 people in the ward, from 7,124 in 2012.

References

Populated places in Kilimanjaro Region